Cerar is a surname. Notable people with the surname include:

Božo Cerar (born 1949), Slovenian diplomat
Franci Cerar, Slovenian science fiction writer
Luka Cerar (born 1993), Slovenian footballer
Miroslav Cerar Jr. (born 1963), Slovenian lawyer and politician, son of Miroslav Cerar Sr.
Miroslav Cerar Sr. (born 1938), Slovenian lawyer, gymnast and Olympic gold medalist and father of Miroslav Cerar Jr.

See also 
 Cerar cabinet, 12th Cabinet of Slovenia